There are two arenas in the United States associated with the name U.S. Cellular Center.

Alliant Energy PowerHouse, formerly U.S. Cellular Center (Cedar Rapids)
U.S. Cellular Center (Asheville), formerly Asheville Civic Center

See also

 U.S. Cellular Coliseum, Bloomington, Illinois